A History of Socialist Thought is a 1927 history book by Harry Laidler.

Bibliography

External links 
 Full text of A History of Socialist Thought at HathiTrust Digital Library

1927 non-fiction books
English-language books
Books about socialism